Dawn Marie Moncrieffe (born 26 January 1968) is a Canadian female deaf former track and field athlete. She has competed at the Deaflympics representing Canada in 1985, 1993 and in 2001. She had won a total of 4 medals in her Deaflympic career which spanned from 1985 to 2001.

Dawn Moncrieffe was born to a family of African descent on 26 January 1968 in the north of Lambeth, England. She was born profoundly deaf due to the maternal rubella. Her family then migrated to Canada and settled in Winnipeg. Dawn studied and graduated at the Manitoba School for the Deaf which is located in Winnipeg.

References 

1968 births
Living people
Deaf competitors in athletics
Canadian female middle-distance runners
Canadian deaf people